Ghent/Industry Zone Heliport  is a heliport serving Ghent University Hospital located near Ghent, East Flanders, Belgium.

See also
 List of airports in Belgium

References

External links 
 Airport record for Ghent/Industry Zone Heliport at Landings.com

Airports in East Flanders
Buildings and structures in Ghent